Star Quest is a 1968 novel by Dean R. Koontz.

Star Quest or StarQuest may also refer to:

Films
 Terminal Voyage  a 1994 science fiction film sometimes released under the tile "Star Quest"
 Star Quest: The Odyssey, a 2009 American science-fiction film

Books
 Star Quest: An Incredible Journey into the Unknown a book in Stewart Cowley's Terran Trade Authority / Galactic Encounters series

Tabletop games
 Star Quest (board game)
 Star Quest (card game)

Videogames
 Star Quest 1 in the 27th century, a 1995 video game
 StarQuest Online, a 2007 video game
 Star Cruiser, a 1988 Japanese video game, whose North American release was planned to be called Star Quest but was cancelled